The Australian Antarctic Names and Medals Committee (AANMC) was established to advise the Government on names for features in the Australian Antarctic Territory and the subantarctic territory of Heard Island and the McDonald Islands. The committee also issues nominations Governor General for the award of the Australian Antarctic Medal.

Committee members were appointed by the Minister or Parliamentary Secretary responsible for Antarctic matters. The committee was founded in 1952 as the Antarctic Names Committee of Australia,   and changed to the current name in 1982 to reflect the multiple functions that the committee is responsible for. The committee was replaced by the Australian Antarctic Division Place names Committee in 2015.

Features named by the committee
 Fyfe Hills, named after W.V. Fyfe, Surveyor General of Western Australia
 Goldsworthy Ridge, named after R.W. Goldsworthy, survey field assistant
 Gowlett Peaks, named afterAlan Gowlett, engineer
 Haigh Nunatak, named after John Haigh, geophysicist
 McNair Nunatak, named after Richard McNair, cook
 Onley Hill, named after L. Onley, weather observer
 Trost Rocks, named after P.A. Trost, electronics engineer

Publication

See also
Australian Antarctic Division
SCAR Composite Gazetteer of Antarctica

UK_Antarctic_Place-Names_Committee

External links
AAD website

Names of places in Antarctica
Government of Australia
Scientific organisations based in Australia
Australian Antarctic Territory
1952 establishments in Australia
Antarctic agencies
Geographical naming agencies
Australian toponymy